The I.O.O.F. Building is a building in Idaho Falls, Idaho, United States. It was built in Romanesque Revival style in c.1909, and served historically as a clubhouse for the local International Order of Odd Fellows chapter, which was formed by 1892.

The building was listed on the National Register of Historic Places in 1984.

It is one of a number of Idaho Falls buildings studied in 1984 and listed on the National Register.  The Hasbrouck Building is the one other relatively pure Romanesque Revival building in that group.

References

External links

Clubhouses on the National Register of Historic Places in Idaho
Buildings and structures completed in 1909
Buildings and structures in Idaho Falls, Idaho
Odd Fellows buildings in Idaho
National Register of Historic Places in Bonneville County, Idaho